"True Faith" is a song by New Order, co-written and co-produced by the band and Stephen Hague. It was the first New Order single since their debut "Ceremony" to be issued in the UK as two separate 12" singles. The second 12" single features two remixes of "True Faith" by Shep Pettibone. Both versions of the 12" (and also the edited 7") include the song "1963". "True Faith" is one of New Order's most popular songs.

The single peaked at No. 4 in the United Kingdom on its original release in 1987. In the United States, "True Faith" became New Order's first single to chart in the Hot 100, ultimately peaking at No. 32.

A "True Faith" remix 12" single and CD single were released in 1994, and another "True Faith" remix 12" single and CD single were released in 2001. The 1994 remix charted in the UK at No. 9.

Original releases
New Order wrote and recorded "True Faith" and "1963" during a 10-day studio session with producer Stephen Hague. The two songs were written as new material for New Order's first singles compilation album, Substance 1987. After the two songs were recorded, the band's US management decided that "True Faith" was the stronger track and would be released as the new single, with "1963" as the B-side ("1963" was remixed and issued as a single in its own right in 1994).

"That wasn't really a happy period in New Order's life," recalled Peter Hook. "Let's just say it was a bit of a battle for me to get on there at all, apart from in the sense of helping write the song. Musically, we were moving more towards straight dance and I was keen on keeping the New Order I'd known and loved. I eventually managed to get my bass on the original version. But, of course, the first thing any remixers do is take off my bass and put their own on. I sometimes feel like attaching a note saying, How about keeping the bass?"

While never appearing on an original album, it was included on most of the band's "best of" collections (Substance 1987, The Best of New Order, Retro, International, Singles and Total). The first public performance of the song took place at the 1987 Glastonbury Festival; this version appears on the group's BBC Radio 1 Live in Concert album.

The original 7" version of the song did not appear on any album until 2011's Total: From Joy Division to New Order.

Composition
The song is composed in the key of D minor with an outro in G major.

As is the case for many New Order songs of this period, the words in the title do not appear anywhere in the lyrics.

The original lyrics included a verse that read "Now that we've grown up together/They're all taking drugs with me". Hague convinced Sumner to change the latter line to "They're afraid of what they see" because he was worried that otherwise it would not get played on the radio. When performing the song live, the band have usually used the original line.

During a live performance in 1993 in Reading, Sumner replaced the first lines of the second verse with the lyrics "When I was a very small boy, Michael Jackson played with me. Now that we've grown up together, he's playing with my willy." This was a topical reference to the allegations of sexual abuse against the singer.

Technical details
"True Faith" was recorded at Advision Studio One, with production by New Order and Stephen Hague and was engineered by David Jacob. According to Hague, the studio featured "...a first generation SSL board and big old UREI Time Align monitors. "True Faith" was created using a wide range of electronic musical equipment. According to an interview in Sound on Sound by Richard Buskin, Hague notes that New Order provided a Yamaha QX 1, an Octave Voyetra 8 polyphonic synthesizer, a Yamaha DX 5 and an Akai S900 sampler, while he provided an E-mu Emulator II and an E-mu SP12.

Critical reception
In 2013, Stereogum ranked "True Faith" number four on their list of the 10 greatest New Order songs, and in 2021, The Guardian ranked the song number one on their list of the 30 greatest New Order songs.

Music video
The release of "True Faith" was accompanied by a surreal music video directed and choreographed by Philippe Decouflé and produced by Michael H. Shamberg.

The opening sequence, showing two men slapping each other, is a reference to Marina Abramović and Ulay's video performance Light/ Dark shot in  1977. Costumed dancers then leap about, fight and slap each other in time to the music, while a person in dark green makeup emerges from an upside-down boxer's speed bag and hand signs the lyrics (in LSF). Other parts of the video were inspired by Bauhaus artist Oskar Schlemmer's Triadisches Ballett.

The video has often been voted amongst the best music videos of its year. Sky Television's channel The Amp, for instance, has it rated as the best video of 1987, Smash Hits magazine's readers rated it as the 3rd best video of 1987 and it won the British Video of the Year in 1988. 

The overall tonality, themes and various elements from the video re-occurred in Decouflé's scenography and choreography for the inauguration ceremonies of the 1992 Winter Olympics in Albertville.

The video was slightly modified for the 1994 re-release, featuring black-and-white clips of females inserted into the later parts of the video.

Track listing

1987 release

True Faith-94 release

Charts

Original version

Weekly charts

1Remix

Year-end charts

"True Faith-94"

Certifications

Cover versions

George Michael version

English singer George Michael covered "True Faith" in 2011 in support of the charity fund Comic Relief. Throughout the song, Michael's vocals are electronically masked using a vocoder, which garnered mixed reactions. In response, he joked: "People like to make exceptions for me." Peaking at no. 27 on the UK Singles Chart, the song made its television debut on BBC, as one of five music videos recorded for Red Nose Day 2011.

Lotte Kestner / The Last of Us Part II version
The trailer for the 2020 action-adventure video game The Last of Us Part II featured the character Ellie performing an acoustic rendition of the song, which bore a striking resemblance to a 2011 cover by Lotte Kestner. When Kestner revealed that she had not been credited for her cover of the song being featured, the game's director Neil Druckmann apologized and blamed it on an oversight. The game's publisher Sony Interactive Entertainment looked into the matter, and Kestner was subsequently credited on promotional materials. The television adaption of The Last of Us would eventually feature Kestner's version in the end credits to the episode "Please Hold to My Hand".

References

External links

1987 songs
1987 singles
1994 singles
Factory Records singles
London Records singles
BBC Records singles
New Order (band) songs
Song recordings produced by Stephen Hague
Songs about drugs
Songs written by Bernard Sumner
Songs written by Gillian Gilbert
Songs written by Peter Hook
Songs written by Stephen Hague
Songs written by Stephen Morris (musician)
George Michael songs
Song recordings produced by George Michael
UK Independent Singles Chart number-one singles